Robert Dale (1812–1853) was an explorer.

Robert Dale may also refer to:
 Robert Dale (politician) (born 1946), member of the Arkansas House of Representatives
 Bob Dale (Robert Jenkins Dale, 1931–2007), English footballer
 Bob Dale (politician) (Robert Alexander Dale, 1875–1953), South Australian unionist and politician
 Robert L. Dale (1924–2020), American pilot with the U.S. Navy and the National Science Foundation
 Robert William Dale (1829–1895), English Congregationalist church leader

See also
Robbie Dale (born 1940), British DJ

 Robert Dale Owen (1801–1877), politician